Ukraine first participated at the Olympic Games as an independent nation in 1994, and has sent athletes to compete in every Summer Olympic Games and Winter Olympic Games since then. The first athlete who won the gold medal for the yellow-blues was Oksana Baiul.

Previously, athletes of modern Ukraine mostly competed as part of the Russian Empire (1900–1912) and the Soviet Union from 1952 to 1988, and after the dissolution of the Soviet Union, Ukrainian athletes were part of the Unified Team in 1992. Tatiana Gutsu became the best athlete of the Unified Team in 1992 from independent Ukraine.

Independently, Ukraine has won a total of 120 medals at the Summer Games and 8 at the Winter Games, with gymnastics at summer and biathlon at winter as the nation's top medal-producing sports.

The National Olympic Committee of Ukraine was created in 1990 and recognized by the International Olympic Committee in 1993.

Ukraine has won a total of 148 medals since it regained independence, with 38 of them gold, the second most amongst all post-Soviet states behind Russia.

Medal tables

Medals by Summer Games

Medals by Winter Games

Medals by summer sport

Medals by winter sport

List of medalists

Summer Olympics

Winter Olympics

Flag bearers 

  – Viktor Petrenko
  – Sergey Bubka
  – Andriy Deryzemlya
  – Yevhen Braslavets
  – Olena Petrova
  – Denys Sylantyev
  – Natalia Yakushenko
  – Yana Klochkova
  – Liliya Ludan
  – Roman Hontyuk
  – Valentina Shevchenko
  – Mykola Milchev
  – Olena Bilosiuk
  – Olena Kostevych, Bohdan Nikishyn

Multiple medal winners

List of Soviet medalists 
List of Soviet medalists who represented Soviet clubs out of the Ukrainian Soviet Socialist Republic and recognized by the Ukrainian NOC.

Summer Olympics

Winter Olympics

The most prominent

See also 
 :Category:Olympic competitors for Ukraine
 List of Olympic champions of Ukraine
 Ukraine at the Paralympics
 Ukraine at the Youth Olympics
 Ukraine at the European Games

Notes

References

External links